Word on Fire is a Catholic media organization founded by Bishop Robert Barron that uses digital and traditional media to introduce Catholicism to the broader world. It rose to prominence through Barron's work as a priest engaging with new media, and has been noted as an effective model for sharing information about Catholicism to the public.

Media formats
Initially Barron worked through radio, and television, hosting the Word on Fire radio show on Relevant Radio and the Word on Fire with Father Barron television show on WGN America. Barron eventually expanded to online distribution through social media, and is active with distributing videos on YouTube. In addition to this, Word on Fire distributes spiritual media as DVDs and books for individual and group study.

Catholicism series (2011)
In 2011, Word on Fire published Catholicism, a ten-part video documentary series that explores the cultural, spiritual, and historical elements of Catholicism. Offered on DVD, the series was also broadcast on PBS stations, prompting PBS's ombudsmen to issue a statement clarifying to the public that it was neither distributed by PBS nor produced using PBS funding, the latter of which was expressed as a concern by PBS viewers.

The series has received numerous praises by figures like papal biographer George Weigel, Cardinal Timothy Dolan and Cardinal Francis George for its effort in pursuing the new evangelization in the modern world. The website Church Militant was critical of the series.

See also 
 Ascension (publisher)
 Augustine Institute
 Ignatius Press
 Saint Benedict Press

References

External links
Word on Fire official website
YouTube channels
Word on Fire Bishop Robert Barron
Word on Fire Institute

Catholic advocacy groups
Catholic media
Televangelism
Catholic radio programs
Christian mass media in the United States
Television shows about Catholicism
Catholic websites